Joseph R. Baczko (pronounced "BASS-co") was the dean of the Lubin School of Business of Pace University until July 2010. Baczko is former President/COO of Blockbuster Entertainment and founder/President of Toys "R" Us International. He is German-born of Hungarian descent and raised in France; during the 1950s Baczko immigrated to the United States with his family, eventually earning a BSFS from the Edmund A. Walsh School of Foreign Service at Georgetown University and an MBA from Harvard University. Baczko also served in Vietnam as an officer in the US Marine Corps.

External links 
 Biography of Joseph R. Baczko
 Lubin School of Business, Pace University
 Pace University

Harvard Business School alumni
Living people
Pace University faculty
Walsh School of Foreign Service alumni
French emigrants to the United States
Year of birth missing (living people)